Calliostoma toshiharui is a species of sea snail, a marine gastropod mollusk in the family Calliostomatidae.

Some authors place this taxon in the subgenus Calliostoma (Kombologion).

Description
The size of the shell varies between 13 mm and 55 mm.

Distribution
This marine species occurs off the Philippines and Borneo.

References

 Kosuge, S., 1997. Description of a new species of the family Trochidae from south-western Pacific Ocean (Gastropoda). Bulletin of the Institute of Malacology, Tokyo 3(4):64–65, pl. 21.

External links
 

toshiharui
Gastropods described in 1997